Jason John Holland  (born 12 August 1972) is a New Zealand former rugby union footballer, who played for Munster from 1999 until 2008, usually as a centre.
Holland played in two Heineken Cup finals in 2000 where he scored from a drop-goal, and 2002, and won 102 Munster caps in total. He also worked as Munster backs coach in 2008. Holland also represented the Ireland A team. Holland returned to his native New Zealand in 2012 to become assistant coach to Canterbury in the ITM Cup before moving to the assistant coach post at the Hurricanes who compete in the Super Rugby competition. He became the Hurricanes head coach in December 2019.

References

External links
Munster Profile

Munster Rugby players
Living people
1972 births
Rugby union centres
New Zealand rugby union players
Ireland Wolfhounds international rugby union players
Rugby union players from New Plymouth